The Jorvi Hospital is part of The Hospital District of Helsinki and Uusimaa (HUS) and Helsinki university central hospital (HUCS). The hospital is located in Karvasmäki, Espoo, Finland; next to Glims Farmstead Museum.

Departments:

• Maternity ward (one of the 3 in the greater Helsinki area) with on-call neonatologist.

• Espoo town wards.

• Children's wing with hospital school and 3 children's wards.

• 24/7 emergency department for both adults and children's (serves mainly Espoo and adjacent municipalities).

• High dependency unit.

• ICU.

• Nationwide comprehensive burn unit (integrated with the ICU).

• 24/7 operating theatre.

• Neurology ward.

• Internal medicine & surgery wards.

References

Hospital buildings completed in 1972
Hospitals in Finland
Buildings and structures in Espoo